Weaving is a surname.

Those bearing it include:

 Jon Weaving (1931-2011), Australian musician
 Hugo Weaving (born 1960), British-Australian actor  
 Samara Weaving (born 1992), Australian actor and model